The second season of Futurama began airing on November 21, 1999 and concluded after 19 episodes on December 3, 2000.  Halfway through the season on February 6, 2000, Fox moved the show from its original timeslot of 8:30pm (following The Simpsons) to 7pm.  At this time, the show lost half of its viewers.

The original 72-episode run of Futurama was produced as four seasons; Fox broadcast the episodes out of the intended order, resulting in five aired seasons.

This list features the episodes in original production order, as featured on the DVD box sets.

The full nineteen episodes of the season have been released on a box set called Futurama: Volume Two, on DVD and VHS. It was first released in the United Kingdom on November 11, 2002, with releases in other regions in 2003. The season was re-released as Futurama: Volume 2, with entirely different packaging to match the newer season released on July 17, 2012.

Episodes

Critical reception

Reception
IGN gave the season a positive review of 9.0/10, "Amazing".

Nielsen ratings
The season tied for 97th in the seasonal ratings with a 5.4% rating and 8.9% share. It tied with King of the Hill.

Home releases

References

Futurama lists
1999 American television seasons
2000 American television seasons
 
Futurama seasons